is a Japanese football player.

Career
Born in Fukuoka, Matsuo made his debut in the J2 League on 31 March 2013 against Gainare Tottori at the Nagasaki Athletic Stadium in which he came on in the 88th minute for Yudai Inoue as V-Varen Nagasaki went on to win the match 3–1.

Club statistics

References

External links 

 Atsushi Matsuo profile at V-Varen Nagasaki

1990 births
Living people
Nippon Bunri University alumni
Association football people from Fukuoka Prefecture
Japanese footballers
J2 League players
Japan Football League players
V-Varen Nagasaki players
Japan Soccer College players
Azul Claro Numazu players
Association football forwards